Bish may refer to:

Music
 Bish (album), by singer/songwriter Stephen Bishop
 Bish (Japanese idol group), a Japanese idol group

People
 Milan D. Bish (1929–2001), American diplomat
 Randy Bish, American editorial cartoonist working for the Pittsburgh Tribune-Review
 Matt Bish (born 1975), Ugandan filmmaker
 Stanley Bish (born 1951), Dutch former professional footballer
 Diane Bish (born 1941) American organist and composer
 Death of Molly Bish (1983–2000) girl from rural Worcester County, Massachusetts

Other uses
 St. Joseph's Patrician College (slang "The Bish"), a secondary school in Ireland
 Bishōnen or "Bish", a Japanese term literally meaning "beautiful youth (boy)"
 Bishōjo or "Bish", a Japanese term used to refer to young and pretty girls

See also
 Bishop (disambiguation)